Krisztián Kovács (born 29 May 2000) is a Hungarian professional footballer who plays for Győri ETO FC.

References

External links

2000 births
Sportspeople from Komárno
Living people
Hungarian footballers
Hungary youth international footballers
Hungary under-21 international footballers
Association football defenders
Győri ETO FC players
Nemzeti Bajnokság II players